Ketel Emamzadeh Hashem , also Romanized as Kotal Emāmzādeh Hāshem, is a village in Amol County, Mazandaran Province, Iran. At the 2006 census, its population was 14, in 5 families.

References 

Populated places in Damavand County